West Georgia Regional Airport , also known as O. V. Gray Field, is a public use airport located five nautical miles (9 km) northwest of the central business district of Carrollton, in Carroll County, Georgia, United States. It is owned by the West Georgia Airport Authority.

Although most U.S. airports use the same three-letter location identifier for the FAA and IATA, this airport is assigned CTJ by the FAA but has no designation from the IATA.

Facilities and aircraft 
It has one asphalt paved runway designated 17/35 which measures 5,503 by 100 feet (1,677 x 30 m).

For the 12-month period ending April 30, 2008, the airport had 24,500 aircraft operations, an average of 67 per day: 98% general aviation and 2% military. At that time there were 43 aircraft based at this airport: 91% single-engine, 5% multi-engine, 2% jet and 2% helicopter.

Incidents and Accidents 
 Atlantic Southeast Airlines Flight 529, which had left Atlanta International Airport for Gulfport–Biloxi International Airport suffered an engine failure and was en route to West Georgia Regional Airport when it crashed into a field, killing eight people and fatally wounding another.
 On September 7, 2016, a Diamond DA20C1 and a Beech F33A collided midair at 10:56am, killing all three people involved. One plane was privately owned and the other was from a flight school in the Carrollton area. Both of the planes crash landed a couple of yards away from end of the runway.

References

External links

 
 

Airports in Georgia (U.S. state)
Buildings and structures in Carroll County, Georgia
Transportation in Carroll County, Georgia